Jahangir Alam Khan (born 31 December 1952) is a Bangladeshi agricultural economist and researcher. He is the incumbent Vice Chancellor of the University of Global Village (UGV). Prior to his appointment in the university, he was the director general of Bangladesh Livestock Research Institute (BLRI). He also served as a director of Bangladesh Agricultural Research Council. In recognition of his contribution in research, the government of Bangladesh awarded him the country's second highest civilian award Ekushey Padak in 2020.

Early life
Khan was born on 31 December 1952 in the Ghatiara village of Brahmanbaria of the then East Bengal (now Bangladesh). His father's name is Siddiqur Rahman Khan. He completed secondary school certificate from Kasba Bi-lateral High School in 1967 and higher secondary school certificate from Bangladesh Agricultural University College in 1969. He graduated in 1973 and obtained a master's degree in 1975 respectively from the Bangladesh Agricultural University in agricultural economics. He received a PhD degree in the same subject from the University of Canterbury in 1983. He completed his post-doctoral dissertation at Lincoln University in 1998.

References 

1952 births
Living people
People from Brahmanbaria district
Recipients of the Ekushey Padak
Bangladeshi economists
Bangladesh Agricultural University alumni
Bangladeshi agriculturalists